Barry Fleming (born May 20, 1965) is an American politician who has served in the Georgia House of Representatives from the 121st district since 2013. He previously served in the Georgia House of Representatives from 2003 to 2009.

In 2021, he introduced an election reform bill that would restrict voting access. Among its many provisions, it would restrict where ballot drop boxes can be located and when they can be accessed, require photo identification for absentee voting, shift back the deadline to request an absentee ballot, and limit early voting hours. Most controversially, it would restrict early voting on Sundays, when Black churches traditionally run "Souls to the Polls" get-out-the-vote efforts; according to The Economist, Black voter turnout is 10 percentage points higher on Sundays.

On March 10, 2021, Hancock County commissioners voted 4-0 to ask for Fleming’s resignation as the county's attorney because of his sponsorship of House Bill 531, which critics call a "voter suppression bill". The 2019 Census shows that "Hancock County's population is around 71% African-American" and 2020 election results showed Joe Biden won Hancock County with 71.7% of the vote versus 27.8% for Donald Trump.

See also
 Republican efforts to make voting laws more restrictive following the 2020 presidential election
 Election Integrity Act of 2021

References

1965 births
21st-century American politicians
Living people
Republican Party members of the Georgia House of Representatives
People from Columbia County, Georgia